Benedict Hutchinson "Ben" Cayenne (22 March 1944 – 1 November 2014) was an athlete from Trinidad and Tobago who specialized in the 800 metres and 4 x 400 metres relay reaching the finals in both events at the 1968 Summer Olympics in Mexico City. He was born in Barrackpore, Trinidad and Tobago and graduated from the University of Maryland in the United States.

After his competitive career ended, Cayenne coached at Swarthmore College in Pennsylvania. He was inducted into the University of Maryland Eastern Shore (UMES) athletics’ Hall of Fame in 1984 and was also inducted into Trinidad and Tobago's Sports Hall of Fame.

Achievements

References

1944 births
2014 deaths
Trinidad and Tobago male sprinters
Trinidad and Tobago male middle-distance runners
Athletes (track and field) at the 1968 Summer Olympics
Olympic athletes of Trinidad and Tobago
Athletes (track and field) at the 1966 British Empire and Commonwealth Games
Athletes (track and field) at the 1970 British Commonwealth Games
Commonwealth Games medallists in athletics
Commonwealth Games silver medallists for Trinidad and Tobago
Athletes (track and field) at the 1967 Pan American Games
Athletes (track and field) at the 1971 Pan American Games
Pan American Games bronze medalists for Trinidad and Tobago
Pan American Games medalists in athletics (track and field)
Competitors at the 1966 Central American and Caribbean Games
Central American and Caribbean Games silver medalists for Trinidad and Tobago
Central American and Caribbean Games bronze medalists for Trinidad and Tobago
Maryland Terrapins men's track and field athletes
Central American and Caribbean Games medalists in athletics
Medalists at the 1971 Pan American Games
Medallists at the 1970 British Commonwealth Games